Copelatus blatchleyi is a species of diving beetle. It is part of the genus Copelatus in the subfamily Copelatinae of the family Dytiscidae. It was described by Young in 1953.

References

blatchleyi
Beetles described in 1953